The 2004 FIBA Europe Under-16 Championship Division B was an international basketball competition held in England and Bulgaria in 2004. Iceland, the winner of Group A (Brighton, England) and Ukraine, the winner of Group B (Veliko Tarnovo, Bulgaria) qualified for Division A.

Medalists

1.   Iceland

2.   Macedonia 

3.   England

Final ranking (comparative)

1.  Ukraine

2.  Macedonia

3.  Iceland

4.  England

5.  Bosnia and Herzegovina

6.  Czech Republic

7.  Bulgaria

8.  Portugal

9.  Hungary

10.  Finland

11.  Netherlands

12.  Estonia

13.  Romania

14.  Sweden

15.  Austria

16.  Belarus

17.  Ireland

18.  Cyprus

19.  Albania

External links
FIBA Archive

FIBA U16 European Championship Division B
2004–05 in European basketball
2004–05 in English basketball
International youth basketball competitions hosted by Bulgaria
International youth basketball competitions hosted by England